Wonder World Amusement Park is a video game for seventh generation consoles developed by British studio Coyote Console and published by Majesco Entertainment.

Gameplay
Wonder World Amusement Park features a carnival setting and an array of mini-games based on carnival games. Some games include ring toss, basketball and knife throwing. Players for the DS use the stylus to push or throw the necessary items, the most common technique being a simple flick upwards.

Reception

The DS version received "mixed" reviews, while the Wii version received "unfavorable" reviews, according to the review aggregation website Metacritic.

References

External links
 
 

2008 video games
Majesco Entertainment games
Nintendo DS games
Party video games
Video games developed in the United Kingdom
Video games set in amusement parks
Wii games